The 2015–16 season was Everton's 62nd consecutive season in the top flight of English football and their 138th year in existence. Everton participated in the Premier League, FA Cup and League Cup. The season covers the period from 1 July 2015 to 30 June 2016. Although the club managed to reach the semi-finals in both the FA Cup and League Cup, their overall performance did not meet expectations. As a result, prior to its last Premier League match of the season, the club sacked third year manager Roberto Martínez.

Kits

First team

Last updated on 3 February 2016

Player awards 
 fan of the season – Adrian Devine
 Player of the Season – Gareth Barry
 Players' Player of the Season – Gareth Barry
 Young Player of the Season – Romelu Lukaku
 Reserve / U21 Player of the Season – Joe Williams
 Goal of the Season – Romelu Lukaku vs. Chelsea

Transfers

Transfers in

Total spending:  £36,700,000

Transfers out

Total incoming:  £9,000,000

Loans out

Competitions

Pre-season and Friendlies
On 22 June 2015, Everton announced they would face Leeds United during pre-season. On 29 June 2015, Everton announced their full preseason fixtures list.

Premier League

League table

Results by matchday

Matches
On 17 June 2015, the fixtures for the forthcoming season were announced.

FA Cup
Everton entered the FA Cup at the Third Round and were drawn at home to Dagenham & Redbridge. They defeated the Daggers 2–0 and were drawn away against Carlisle United in the Fourth Round. The tie at Brunton Park was the first held there since the ground had flooded in Storm Desmond and ended in a 3–0 win for Everton. In the Fifth Round, Everton were drawn away to AFC Bournemouth. They won 2–0 and followed that with another 2–0 win against Chelsea at Goodison Park. They advanced to the semi-final at Wembley Stadium where they lost to Manchester United.

League Cup

As a Premier League team not involved in any UEFA competitions, Everton entered the League Cup at the Second Round stage. They defeated Barnsley away, after extra time, and were drawn away to Reading in the Third Round. The Toffees hosted fellow Premier League side Norwich City in the Fourth Round and won 4–3 on penalties. They beat Middlesbrough 2–0 away in the quarter-final, which was their first appearance at this stage since 2007–08. Everton lost to Manchester City 4–3 on aggregate in the two-legged semi-final.

Statistics

Appearances

|}

References

Everton
Everton F.C. seasons